Ingrid Schoeller (born 1942) was a German film actress best known for her roles as an action heroine in the 1960s.

Tall, slim and blonde, she played the lead role in spy films such as A 008, operazione Sterminio.

Selected filmography
 I Don Giovanni della Costa Azzurra (1962)
 My Son, the Hero (1962)
 I maniaci (1964)
 Gentlemen of the Night (1964) 
 008: Operation Exterminate (1965) 
 Son of Django (1967) 
 Psychopath (1968)
 The Son of Black Eagle (1968)

External links and sources 
 

German film actresses
1942 births
Living people
20th-century German actresses